Towe Marianne Lundman (born 18 December 1992 in Uppsala) is a Swedish curler.

She is a 2013 Swedish mixed champion.

Teams

Women's

Mixed

Mixed doubles

Personal life
Towe Lundman is married to Jakob Lundman. They have one child.

She graduated from Uppsala University.

References

External links
 
 

Living people
1992 births
Sportspeople from Uppsala
Swedish female curlers
Swedish curling champions
Uppsala University alumni